Nanda Zulmi (2 June 1989 – 6 July 2017) was an Indonesian footballer who played as a midfielder. He played for PSAP Sigli in the Indonesia Super League at the 2011–12 season.

Club statistics

References

External links

1989 births
2017 deaths
Association football midfielders
Indonesian footballers
Liga 1 (Indonesia) players
PSAP Sigli players
Sportspeople from Aceh